Berchem-Sainte-Agathe station is a railway station in the municipality of Berchem-Sainte-Agathe in Brussels, Belgium. The station, operated by the SNCB/NMBS is located on the line 50, which connects the Brussels-North railway station to the Gent-Sint-Pieters railway station between the stations of Jette and Groot-Bijgaarden. It can be accessed from the Place de la Gare/Stationplein next to the Chaussée de Gand/Gentsesteenweg.

The station connects with Brussels tram routes 82 and 83 as well as bus routes 84 and 87.

Train services
The station is served by the following service(s):

Brussels RER services (S4) Aalst - Denderleeuw - Brussels-Luxembourg (- Etterbeek - Merode - Vilvoorde) (weekdays)
Brussels RER services (S10) Aalst - Denderleeuw - Brussels - Dendermonde

References

Railway stations in Brussels
Sint-Agatha-Berchem
Railway stations opened in 1864